The NDJ3 "Great Wall", previously labeled the "Harmony Great Wall" is the only standard speed diesel multiple unit that is still operating in China. It was first designed to be used for passenger transport in the 2008 Olympics, and has become a mature technology platform with export orders to Nigeria despite initial flaws related to overheating of electrical cables in the power car.

Description 
To fulfil the need for passenger transport between Beijing and Badaling during the 2008 Summer Olympics, the Ministry of Railways ordered four NDJ3 DMU trains, with the numbering NDJ3 0001-0004. All of them are with Beijing Bureau, Beijing sector Nanko depot, operating on Line S2 between Beijing North station and Badaling station via Yanqing station, with a later addition of another service from Beijing North to Shacheng station.

The NDJ3 is developed from the NZJ1 "Xinshuguang" with a similar 2M7T layout where motor cars are diesel locomotives located on either end in a push–pull configuration, while also drawing from the experience of DF11 and DF11G locomotives. The Qishuyan designed locomotives are fitted with a diesel-electric drive, generating AC which is then converted to DC for the traction motors. The main generator is supplemented by an auxiliary generator, which provides power to the passenger cabins. The Nanjing Puzhen designed passenger carriages are based on the 25T carriage while the exterior paint draws inspiration from the Harmony trains. The passenger carriages have wide doors, extra large sightseeing windows, rotatable seating, disabled toilets and other passenger amenities designed for increased passenger comfort.

Flaws 
While running the S2 which has steep gradients, a burning smell was often noticed coming from the resistors that dissipate energy from braking. This was found to be the fault of cable 13, which heated up significantly in use. It was due to the design where the cable carries the power for both the Eddy current brake and the magnetic excitation for the 4th traction motor. The high temperatures poses a serious risk to safety, as it would degrad the cable faster, leading to a higher risk of fire, but also the risk of the brakes failing if the current is not supplied. To rectify this flaw, the cables for traction motor 4 were separated into separate cables for braking and motor power. Nonetheless, it has not had any serious accidents, and the set was awarded first place in the 2009 Railway Technology prize.

Service history

China 
This train was put into operation on 6 August 2008 on Line S2. Although it carried the name "Harmony Great Wall" (Chinese: 和谐长城号), it does not actually belong to the Harmony series of trains. During their service, they have also occasionally been used on other lines.

At the end of 2017, Beijing bought two more sets for Huairou–Miyun line. These sets, numbered NDJ3 0005-0007 have only second class seating and do not have a buffet car, significantly increasing the seating capacity. Line S2 was also supposed to receive another three sets, but they were never delivered for unknown reasons.

From October 2019 onwards, the "Harmony" (Hexie) logos were gradually removed from the sets. These sets then carried only the "Great Wall" (Changchen) logos at the front.

Nigeria 
In 2019, the Nigerian Railway Corporation ordered two sets, as part of the construction of standard gauge railways in the country, in an order with six DF11G, nine DF8 and two DF7 locomotives. In Nigerian service, the sets are classed as CDD5E1. These sets commenced service with the Lagos-Ibadan railway on 7 December 2020.

Set composition

China Railway

References 

A1A-A1A locomotives
Diesel multiple units of China
Diesel locomotives of China
Diesel multiple units with locomotive-like power cars
CRRC multiple units
Rolling stock of Nigeria